Eiliv Howard Anderson was born in Robsart, Saskatchewan, in 1934. He is a corporate executive, with a degree from the executive program of Queen's University's School of Business.  He served as president of a consulting firm, as well as a rancher, before being elected as an MLA in 1975 for Shaunavon. However, he lost that riding to Dwain Lingenfelter in 1978. He served as an organizer for the Liberal Party of Saskatchewan, and was an influential man in the Canadian beef industry and the provincial government. He was awarded the Queen's Silver Jubilee Medal in 1977 for his work.

From 1982 until 1987, Eiliv Anderson was Chairman of Farm Credit Corporation Canada, a federal crown agency.

References 
 Canadian Who's Who 1997 entry

People from Rural Municipality Reno No. 51, Saskatchewan
1934 births
Living people
Canadian Lutherans
Saskatchewan Liberal Party MLAs
Canadian people of Norwegian descent